U.S. Post Office is a historic post office building located at Lancaster, Lancaster County, Pennsylvania. It was built between 1928 and 1930, and designed by the Office of the Supervising Architect under Acting Supervising Architect James A. Wetmore. It is a two-story, fifteen bay wide building with a high basement and attic and slate covered mansard roof. It is faced in Indiana limestone and features a balustrade and parapet at the roofline. It has a one-story rear wing. The front elevation has eleven bays separated by two-story Tuscan order pilasters. It is an example of Beaux-Arts-style architecture with Moderne influences. The site was previously the location of the Lancasterian School and a Moravian graveyard. The building is now a corporate headquarters for Auntie Anne's.

It was listed on the National Register of Historic Places in 1981.

References

Lancaster
Beaux-Arts architecture in Pennsylvania
Moderne architecture in Pennsylvania
Government buildings completed in 1930
Buildings and structures in Lancaster, Pennsylvania
National Register of Historic Places in Lancaster, Pennsylvania